is a 1999 Japanese film directed by Yoshimitsu Morita.

Cast
 Kyōka Suzuki as Kafuka Ogawa
 Shin'ichi Tsutsumi as Masaki Shibata
 Ittoku Kishibe as Inspector Nagoshi
 Naoki Sugiura as Professor Saneyuki Fujishiro
 Kirin Kiki as Defence Counsel Shigure Nagamura
 Toru Emori as Prosecutor Michihiko Kusama
 Hideko Yoshida as Kafka's Mother
 Mirai Yamamoto as Mikako Kudo
 Masanobu Katsumura as Sunaoka
 Jun Kunimura as Shibata Toshimitsu
 Yasuhito Ohchi as Kudo Keisuke as a child
 Takashi Sasano as Tezuka

Awards 
42nd Blue Ribbon Awards
 Won: Best Actress - Kyōka Suzuki

49th Berlin International Film Festival
 Nominated: Golden Bear

21st Yokohama Film Festival
 Won: Best Film
 Won: Best Director - Yoshimitsu Morita
 Won: Best Screenplay - Sumio Oomori

References

External links
 

1999 films
Films directed by Yoshimitsu Morita
1990s Japanese-language films
Films scored by Toshihiko Sahashi
1990s Japanese films